Dagaon is a village in Kamrup district of Assam, India. It is situated on the north bank of the Brahmaputra River.

Transportation
Dagaon is near National Highway 31, Baihata-Goreswar road lies in its west and is well connected to nearby towns with different modes of transport.

See also
Dakhala

References

Villages in Kamrup district